Black Tom may refer to:

"Black Tom", nickname of Thomas Butler, 10th Earl of Ormond (c.1531–1614), Irish peer and Lord Treasurer of Ireland in the 16th and early 17th centuries.
"Black Tom", nickname of Thomas Fairfax, 3rd Lord Fairfax of Cameron (1612–1671), English Civil War Parliamentary general
"Black Tom", an informal name of a neighborhood within the Harpur ward of Bedford, England, named after a notorious highwayman who operated in the area in the late eighteenth and early nineteenth centuries
Black Tom explosion (30 July 1916), Jersey City, New Jersey; act of World War I sabotage on American ammunition supplies by German agents to prevent shipments to the Allies
Black Tom Cassidy (created October 1976), a Marvel Comics supervillain, an enemy of the X-Men
A game of tag; see